Davie Allan is an American guitarist best known for his work on soundtracks to various teen and biker movies in the 1960s.  Allan's backing band is almost always the Arrows (i.e., Davie Allan & the Arrows), although the Arrows have never had a stable lineup.

Biography
Allan grew up in the San Fernando Valley in Southern California, and learned to play guitar as a teenager.  His career as a musician began when he teamed up with Mike Curb, a friend he met in the choir at Grant High School in Valley Glen, California, to form an instrumental surf combo.  In 1963, Curb founded Curb Records, the first of many labels he would run, and released the first Davie Allan single, “War Path”.  Allan participated in recording a number of other singles for Curb's label, under group names like the Sudells, the Heyburners, and the Zanies.

In 1964, Curb founded Sidewalk Records (which was distributed by Capitol subsidiary Tower Records), brought Allan with him as a session musician, and secured a recording contract for the newly formed Arrows.  Curb had also made a deal to supply Roger Corman's American International Pictures with soundtracks. Allan had come to Corman's attention from his playing on the soundtrack of Skaterdater.

Davie Allan and The Arrows
Early Davie Allan and The Arrows tracks were stereotypical instrumental surf numbers, with clear-as-a-bell guitar sounds and light, crisp drum work.  Though these sides were good musically, and modestly successful commercially (“Apache '65” became a local radio hit), Allan would find his greatest success when his sound mutated soon thereafter.

When Curb assigned soundtrack duties for biker film The Wild Angels to Allan and the Arrows, it would prove a breakthrough success.  The song from the film's opening, "Blues' Theme", an aggressive, repetitive and very catchy instrumental showcasing Allan's new fuzz (heavily distorted) guitar sound became their biggest hit (it was also one of the first songs Eddie Van Halen learned to play on brother Alex's guitar).  The song stayed on the Billboard charts for 17 weeks (it peaked at #37) (#36 in Canada).  The single, backed with “Bongo Party”, and the soundtrack album both sold well.  Rumors have stated that the melody in "Blues' Theme" was stolen from Louie Shelton's guitar lick in "Last Train to Clarksville", but "Last Train to Clarksville" was recorded on July 25, 1966, while The Wild Angels debuted in the theaters on July 20, 1966.

Davie Allan & the Arrows went on to record a number of other soundtracks for similar AIP films over the next few years, like Devil's Angels, Thunder Alley, and The Born Losers, as well as several studio albums.  All contained quality material, but none would prove as successful as "Blues' Theme".

By the time Tower Records and Sidewalk Records were dissolved in 1968, Allan had his name on some 14 albums and a prolific string of singles.  Allan cut a few singles for MGM Records in the early '70s, continuing his association with Curb, but after that his career faltered.

Career revival
Beginning with the Loud, Loose and Savage album in 1994, a compilation of tracks recorded over the previous 10 years, Allan (with all-new Arrows in tow) began a bid to revive his career.  The album was well received by critics, and since then he has released several more albums, including a collaboration with the Phantom Surfers, Ramonetures, an album of instrumental versions of Ramones songs, done Ventures-style. A follow up album by the Ramonetures features Ventures-infused instrumental covers of songs by X. Featuring the playing of DJ Bonebrake and Billy Zoom of X, the album's totle Johnny Walk Don't Run Paulene is a portmanteau of well known songs by X ("Johnny hit & run Paulene") and the Ventures ("Walk don't run").  

The band Danzig recorded a cover of "Devil's Angels", which is the lead track on the covers album Skeletons. Singer Glenn Danzig has said he had been wanting to cover the song since 1979, and so the version is in the style of his band of that era, the Misfits.

Musical legacy

Allan's most notable contribution is from popularizing the fuzz guitar sound using the then recently invented fuzzbox which made its popular debut on "(I Can't Get No) Satisfaction". While Link Wray was the pioneer of guitar distortion, Allan pushed it to a new level, distorting his signal so much as to give his guitar tone a buzzing, grinding quality: "fuzzy". Guitar sounds along similar lines would become a staple of 1970s rock and Allan's penchant for extreme, heavy, noisy guitar work displayed on tracks like "Devil's Rumble", "Cycle-Delic" and "King Fuzz" presaged 1980s acts like Sonic Youth.

FUZ
Davie Allan & the Arrows were covered by FUZ issue #1, a zine by Seth Wimpfheimer. It contains a history of Allan's career, as well as a discography..

Discography

Singles
All singles by Davie Allan & The Arrows except as noted

References

External links
Davie Allan official homepage
Story from Davie Allan about his career and "Blues' Theme"
Davie Allan Interview NAMM Oral History Library (2011)
 
 

Living people
Year of birth missing (living people)
American rock guitarists
American male guitarists
American session musicians
People from the San Fernando Valley
Grant High School (Los Angeles) alumni